Curi (possibly from Quechua for gold) is a mountain in the Cusco Region in Peru, about  high. It is situated in the Paucartambo Province, Caicay District, and in the Quispicanchi Province, in the districts Andahuaylillas and Urcos.
Curi lies on the right bank of the Vilcanota River, north of the mountain Wiraqucha.

References 

Mountains of Peru
Mountains of Cusco Region